Marble Creek is a stream in Ralls County in the U.S. state of Missouri. It is a tributary of the Mississippi River.

The name Marble Creek appears to be a misnomer as there are no known deposits of marble along its course.

See also
List of rivers of Missouri

References

Rivers of Ralls County, Missouri
Rivers of Missouri